Ava Gene's is an Italian restaurant currently and temporarily operating as the marketplace Shipshape Goods in southeast Portland, Oregon's Richmond neighborhood, in the United States.

History
The restaurant was converted into temporary marketplace with a "walk-up window" called Shipshape Goods in 2020, during the COVID-19 pandemic.

See also
 List of Italian restaurants

References

External links

 
 
 Ava Gene's at Bon Appétit
 Ava Gene's at Zomato

Italian restaurants in Portland, Oregon
Richmond, Portland, Oregon
Year of establishment missing